Koliadka are traditional songs usually sung in Eastern Slavic, Central European and Eastern European countries during the Christmas holiday season. It is believed that everything sung about will come true.

The history of koliadka 

Koliadka have been used since pre-Christian times in Kievan Rus'. Those songs were used with ritual purposes. First koliadkas described ancient people's ideas about creation, natural phenomenons and structure of the world. With the advent of Christianity content of koliadkas began to acquire the relevant religious meaning and features.

Thus now koliadkas are mostly Christmas carols which describe the birth of Jesus Christ and biblical stories happened in connection with the event. However heathen roots are still there.

In modern culture 
Serbians and Montenegrins sing koliadkas dedicated to Saint Nicholas in their churches. Slovaks, Czechs and sometimes Belarusians sing koliadkas not only on Saint Nicholas Day (which they celebrate on December 6), but on Saint Stephen Day (December 26) too.

There are other types of winter holidays ritual songs except koliadkas in Ukraine, named schedrivkas and zasivalkas. In fact their purposes are clearly divided. In modern Ukrainian culture these concepts are intertwined, mixed and acquired traits of each other.

Koliadkas are often sung in countries where big diasporas are present, including Ukrainians which live in Canada (1 251 170 persons).

Koliadkas which are dedicated to saints 
There are several koliadkas which are dedicated to Saint Mykolai in Ukraine. Among them: "Ой, хто, хто Миколая любить" ("Who Loves Saint Nicholas"), "Ходить по землі Святий Миколай" ("Saint Mykolai Walks Around The World"), "Миколай, Миколай ти до нас завітай!" (Mykolai, Mykolai, Come To Visit Us!).

"The Little Swallow" 
One of the most popular koliadka (schedrivka) in the world is Ukrainian "Щедрик" ("Shchedryk"), known in English as "The Little Swallow". This carol has pre-Christian roots. Folk song was arranged by Ukrainian composer and teacher Mykola Leontovych in 1916. "Shchedryk" was later adapted as an English Christmas carol, "Carol of the Bells", by popular American composer, educator, and choral conductor of Ukrainian ethnic extraction Peter J. Wilhousky following a performance of the original song by Alexander Koshetz's Ukrainian National Chorus at Carnegie Hall on October 5, 1921. Peter J. Wilhousky copyrighted and published his new lyrics (which actually were not based on the Ukrainian lyrics) in 1936.

Conceptually Ukrainian lyrics of this song meets the definition of schedrivka while English content of "Carol of the Bells" indicates it as koliadka or Christmas carol in other words.

On December 9, 2016, Georgian-born British singer Katie Melua and The Gori Women's Choir (which is conducted by Teona Tsiramua) sang original Ukrainian "Shchedryk" on BBC.

See also 
 "Shchedryk" (song)
 Koliada
 
 Koledovanie
 List of Christmas carols
 Ukrainian folk music

References

 
Ukrainian culture
Czech culture
Slovak culture
Ukrainian-Canadian culture
Slavic culture
Russian folk songs
Belarusian folk songs
Ukrainian folk songs
Slavic Christmas traditions